Let the World See is an American three-part television documentary series which premiered on January 6, 2022 on ABC. The documentary looks at the life and murder of 14-year-old Emmett Till and its effects of the Civil Rights Movement and African-American life today.

Episodes

References

External links
 
 

2020s American documentary television series
2020s American television miniseries
2022 American television series debuts
2022 American television series endings
American Broadcasting Company original programming
English-language television shows
Historical television series
Television series by Roc Nation
Television series by Kapital Entertainment